The Bridle Drift Dam Nature Reserve is a reserve on the Bridle Drift Dam in the Wild Coast region of the Eastern Cape, South Africa. The reserve lies on the southern bank of the Buffalo River next to the Fort Pato Nature Reserve.

History 
The  reserve was created in 1973 for the conservation of the dams's fauna and flora.

See also 

 List of protected areas of South Africa

References 

Nature reserves in South Africa
Eastern Cape Provincial Parks